Storyville is Robbie Robertson's second solo album. It is focused on the famous jazz homeland section of New Orleans and on that part of the South in general. He contributed one song ("Breakin' the Rules") to Wim Wenders' soundtrack to his 1991 film, Until the End of the World.

In 2005 the album was reissued together with Robbie Robertson as 2CD in an expanded edition, both with two bonus tracks. Cover photography by Syndey Byrd, Art Directed by Mark Andresen.

Track listing
All songs written by Robbie Robertson unless otherwise indicated.
 "Night Parade" – 5:05
 "Hold Back the Dawn" – 5:25
 "Go Back to Your Woods" (Robertson, Bruce Hornsby) – 4:48 produced by Robertson and Gersh
 "Soap Box Preacher" – 5:17
 "Day of Reckoning (Burnin for You)" (Robertson, David Ricketts) – 6:43
 "What About Now" (Robertson, Ivan Neville) – 5:08
 "Shake This Town" – 5:21
 "Breakin the Rules" – 5:48
 "Resurrection" – 5:18
 "Sign of the Rainbow" (Robertson, Martin Page) – 5:24 produced by Robertson, Hague and Page
Bonus tracks on the 2005 expanded edition:
"Storyville" – 1:10   previously unreleased Storyville outtake
"The Far, Lonely Cry of Trains" – 2:51

Personnel
Robbie Robertson – vocals, acoustic guitar on 4 6, electric guitar, organ on 4
Jerry Marotta – drums on 1 4 6 10, percussion on 10
Guy Pratt – bass on 1 2 6 9
Bill Dillon – guitar on 1–2, 4–5, 7 & 9, mandolin on 4
Alex Acuña – percussion on 1–2, 5–6 & 9
Paul Moore – keyboard on 2, 5, 8 & 10, drum programming on 8

Additional personnel
Ronnie Foster – Hammond organ on 1
Code Blue (see below) – backing vocals on 1, 3 & 7
Wardell Quezergue – horn arrangement on 1, 3–4 & 8–9
Horn Section #1 (see below) – horns on 1, 4 & 9
Billy Ward – drums on 2
Stephen Hague – keyboard on 2 & 7, keyboard bass on 4, programming on 7
Rick Danko – backing vocal on 2
Russell Batiste, Jr. – drums on 3
George Porter Jr. – bass & backing vocal on 3
Leo Nocentelli – rhythm guitar on 3
Art Neville – organ on 3, backing vocal on 3
Bruce Hornsby – keyboard on 3, backing vocal on 3
Cyril Neville – percussion on 3
Big Chief Bo Dollis of the Wild Magnolias of Mardi Gras Indians – backing vocal & on 3, chant on 3
Big Chief Monk Boudreaux of the Golden Eagles of Mardi Gras Indians – backing vocal & chant on 3
Horn Section #2 (see below) – horns on 3 & 8
Ronald Jones – drums on 4 & 8
Garth Hudson – keyboard on 4, 7 & 9
Neil Young – backing vocal on 4
John Robinson – drums on 5 & 7
David Ricketts – bass, guitar, programming & keyboards on 5
Jared Levine – hi-hat on 5
Yvonne Williams – backing vocal on 5
Carmen Twillie – backing vocal on 5
Clydene Jackson – backing vocal on 5
Roy Galloway – backing vocal on 5
Mark Isham – horn arrangement on 5
Horn Section #3 (see below) – horns on 5
Ivan Neville – keyboards on 6, backing vocal on 6
Ndugu Chancler – snare on 6
Aaron Neville – backing vocal on 6 10
Mark Leonard – bass on 7
Charlie Pollard – keyboard on 7, programming on 7
Rebirth Brass Band (see below) – horns on 7, percussion on 7
Ginger Baker – skip snare on 7
Zion Harmonizers (see below) – backing vocal on 7 9 10
David Baerwald – backing vocal on 7
Mike Mills – backing vocal on 7
Robert Bell – bass on 8 & 10, drum programming on 8
Paul Buchanan – guitar on 8, backing vocal on 8
Zigaboo Modeliste – drums on 9
Martin Page – keyboard, piano, programming & backing vocal on 10

Horn Section #1 (arranged by Wardell Quezergue)
Warren Bell – soprano saxophone
Duane Van Paulin – trombone
Stacey Cole – trumpet
Amadee Castenell – tenor saxophone
Fred Kemp – tenor saxophone

Horn Section #2 (arranged by Wardell Quezergue)
Amadee Castenell – tenor saxophone
Duane Van Paulin – trombone
Carl Blouin – baritone saxophone
Anthony Dagardi – soprano saxophone
Brian Graber – trumpet

Horn Section #3 (arranged by Mark Isham)
Mark Isham – trumpet, flugelhorn
Ken Kugler – trombone
Richard Mitchell – tenor saxophone
Dan Higgins – alto saxophone
John J. Mitchell – bass clarinet

Code Blue
Yadonna Wise
Dorene Wise

Rebirth Brass Band
Roderick Paulin
Keith Frazier
Keith Anderson
Glen Andrews
Stafford Agee
Ajay Mallery
Philip Frazier
Kermit Ruffins

Zion Harmonizers
Joseph Warrick
Louis Jones
Nolan Washington
Willie Williams
Howard Bowie

Charts
Album

Single

References

1991 albums
Albums produced by Stephen Hague
Geffen Records albums
Robbie Robertson albums
Albums produced by Robbie Robertson